Svante Sture may refer to:
Svante Nilsson Sture (1460–1512), regent of Sweden.
Svante Stensson Sture (Svante Sture the Younger, 1517–1567), Swedish count, statesman and riksmarsk.